Consumer information may refer to:

Mandatory labelling, product information for consumers
Customer data, information collected about the consumer during the buying process for the purpose of customer intelligence, market research, etc.